Scobee may refer to:

Dick Scobee (1939–1986), American astronaut
Josh Scobee (born 1982), American football kicker
3350 Scobee, a main-belt asteroid
Scobee (crater), a lunar impact crater